In mathematics and more specifically in field theory, a radical extension of a field K is an extension of K that is obtained by adjoining a sequence of nth roots of elements.

Definition
A simple radical extension is a simple extension F/K generated by a single element  satisfying  for an element b of K.  In characteristic p, we also take an extension by a root of an Artin–Schreier polynomial to be a simple radical extension.   A radical series is a tower  where each extension  is a simple radical extension.

Properties
 If E is a radical extension of F and F is a radical extension of K then E is a radical extension of K.
 If E and F are radical extensions of K in an extension field C of K, then the compositum EF (the smallest subfield of C that contains both E and F) is a radical extension of K.
 If E is a radical extension of F and E > K > F then E is a radical extension of K.

Solvability by radicals
Radical extensions occur naturally when solving polynomial equations in radicals. In fact a solution in radicals is the expression of the solution as an element of a radical series: a polynomial f over a field K is said to be solvable by radicals if there is a  splitting field of f over K contained in a radical extension of K.

The Abel–Ruffini theorem states that such a solution by radicals does not exist, in general, for equations of degree at least five. Évariste Galois showed that an equation is solvable in radicals if and only if its Galois group is solvable. The proof is based on the fundamental theorem of Galois theory and the following theorem.

The proof is related to Lagrange resolvents. Let  be a primitive nth root of unity (belonging to K).

It follows from this theorem that a Galois extension may be extended to a radical extension if and only if its Galois group is solvable (but there are non-radical Galois extensions whose Galois group is solvable, for example ). This is, in modern terminology, the criterion of solvability by radicals that was provided by Galois. The proof uses the fact that the Galois closure of a simple radical extension of degree n is the extension of it by a primitive nth root of unity, and that the Galois group of the nth  roots of unity is cyclic.

References
 
 

Galois theory
Equations